Green Lake is a lake located in Renfrew County, Ontario, Canada.

See also
List of lakes in Ontario

References
 National Resources Canada

Lakes of Renfrew County